Osman Nusairi is a playwright and award-winning translator of Sudanese origin. He has translated two Arabic novels into English - Nawal el-Saadawi's Two Women in One (1985; co-translator with Jana Gough) and Reem Bassiouney's The Pistachio Seller (2009). The latter work won the Arkansas Arabic Translation Award in 2009.

He worked as a theatre director in the Sudanese National Theatre and as a Lecturer of Drama at Khartoum Institute of Music and Drama in 1978, having studied Theatre Direction at East 15 Acting School and University College, Cardiff University.

Major translations
 The Strong Breed, Wole Soyinka (1979) 
 The Great Sermon Handicap, P.G. Wodehouse (1984) 
 The Arab Horse (for Citibank), 1984 
 Two Women in One, Nawal el-Saadawi 1986 
 Lawless World, Philippe Sandes (2006) 
 The Pistachio Seller, Reem Bassiouney (2009)
 The Rule of Law, Lord Thomas Bingham (2010) 
 Criminal Law Reform in Sudan (Jointly)- Redress 2011 
 Sudan Arabic Texts (2011) 
 Voiceover translations for the Channel 4 documentary, The Holy War of Words.

Plays

Broadcast by the BBC World Service in English  
 Life and Times of Christopher Abdullah
 The Town Crier
 The Village Teacher
 The Intermediate Technologist
 Gordon of Khartoum
 The Desert Trek of Re-education

Stage plays 
 Board of Discipline (Khartoum performance)
 Mahmood (UK performances)
 An Evening With The Ancestors (UK performances)
 Refugees – live performance at City Hall as part of the London Refugee Housing Conference 2002

See also
 List of Arabic-to-English translators

References

Arabic–English translators
American translators
Year of birth missing (living people)
Living people